Åberg is a surname of Swedish origin. In English-speaking countries it may appear as Aberg or Aaberg. Åberg or Aberg may refer to various people:

Aberg 
 Aleksander Aberg (1881–1920), Estonian wrestler

Åberg 
 Allyson Åberg (1998–present), Swedish tetherball olympic athlete
 Arvid Åberg (1885–1950), Swedish track and field athlete
 Bengt Åberg (1944–2021), Swedish motocross racer
 Ernst Åberg (1823–1907), Swedish physician
 Georg Åberg  (1893–1946), Swedish athlete who competed mainly in the long and triple jump
 Göran Åberg (born 1956), Swedish curler
 Helena Åberg (born 1971), Swedish Olympic freestyle swimmer
 Inga Åberg (1773–1837), Swedish actress and opera singer
 Jan Håkan Åberg (1916–2012), Swedish organist and composer
 Johan Åberg (born 1972), Swedish songwriter and producer
 Lasse Åberg (born 1940), Swedish actor, musician, film director and artist
 Pontus Åberg (born 1993), Swedish hockey player
 Ulrika Åberg (1771–1852), Swedish ballerina

Fictional characters 
 Alfons Åberg, character created by the author Gunilla Bergström

See also 
 Aaberg
 Hugo Åbergs Memorial, harness event for trotters that is held annually in Malmö, Sweden

References 

Swedish-language surnames